The Roman Catholic Archdiocese of Botucatu is an archdiocese located in the city of Botucatu in Brazil.

History
 June 7, 1908: Established as Diocese of Botucatu from the Diocese of São Paulo

In 1937 the bishop of the diocese, Carlos Duarte Costa resigned under pressure from the Vatican. He would later go on to form a Brazilian Catholic Church that allowed married priests and ended personal confessions.

 April 19, 1958: Promoted as Metropolitan Archdiocese of Botucatu

Bishops

Ordinaries
 Bishops of Botucatu (Latin Rite)
 Lúcio Antunes de Souza (1908.10.17 – 1923.10.19)
 Carlos Duarte Costa (1924.07.04 – 1937.09.22)
 Antonio Colturato, O.F.M. Cap. (1938.04.12 – 1946.05.05)
 Henrique Hector Golland Trindade, O.F.M. (1948.05.15 – 1958.04.19)
 Archbishops of Botucatu
 Henrique Hector Golland Trindade, O.F.M. (1958.04.19 – 1968.03.27)
 Vicente Ângelo José Marchetti Zioni (1968.03.27 – 1989.05.30)
 Antônio Maria Mucciolo (1989.05.30 – 2000.06.07)
 Aloysio José Leal Penna, S.J. (2000.06.07 – 2008.11.19)
 Maurício Grotto de Camargo (2008.11.19 - present)

Auxiliary bishop
Silvio Maria Dário (1965-1968), appointed Bishop of Itapeva, São Paulo

Other priests of this diocese who became bishops
José Melhado Campos, appointed Bishop of Lorena, São Paulo in 1960
Carlos José de Oliveira, appointed Bishop of Apucarana, Parana in 2018

Suffragan dioceses
 Diocese of Araçatuba 
 Diocese of Assis
 Diocese of Bauru
 Diocese of Lins
 Diocese of Marília
 Diocese of Ourinhos
 Diocese of Presidente Prudente

Sources
 GCatholic.org
 Catholic Hierarchy
 Diocese website

Roman Catholic dioceses in Brazil
Roman Catholic ecclesiastical provinces in Brazil
Christian organizations established in 1908
 
Roman Catholic dioceses and prelatures established in the 20th century
1908 establishments in Brazil